Sesto may refer to:

People

Surname 
 Camilo Sesto (1946–2019), Spanish singer
 Cesare da Sesto, (1477–1523) Italian painter
 Count Sesto, an Italian noble title

Given name 
 Sesto Bruscantini (1919–2003), Italian opera singer
 Sesto Pals (–2008), Romanian writer
 Sesto Prete (1919–1991), Italian-American philologist
 Sesto Rocchi (1909–1991), Italian luthier

Places 
 Sesto al Reghena, Pordenone, Italy
 Sesto Calende, Varese, Italy
 Sesto Campano, Isernia, Italy
 Sesto ed Uniti, Cremona, Italy
 Sesto Fiorentino, Florence, Italy
 Sesto San Giovanni, Milano, Italy
 Sexten (Italian: Sesto), Bolzano, Italy

See also
Sestos, an ancient city in Turkey
Sestu, an Italian municipality in the Province of Cagliari